The Cameroon national futsal team, also known as the Indomitable Lions, is controlled by the Cameroonian Football Federation, the governing body for futsal in Cameroon and represents the country in international futsal competitions.

Tournaments

FIFA Futsal World Cup
 1989 to 2004 – Did not enter
 2008 – Did not qualify
 2012 – Did not enter
 2016 – Did not qualify
 2020 - Did not qualify

African Futsal Championship
 1996 – Did not enter
 2000 – Did not enter
 2004 – Did not qualify
 2008 – Round 1
 2011 – Cancelled
 2016 – Did not qualify

Footnotes

References

External links
 Fédération Camerounaise de Football

Cameroon
National sports teams of Cameroon
Futsal in Cameroon